Niklas Stark (born 14 April 1995) is a German professional footballer who plays as a centre-back or defensive midfielder for Bundesliga club Werder Bremen and the Germany national team.

Club career

1. FC Nürnberg
Stark made his Bundesliga debut on 27 April 2013 in a 2–1 loss to 1899 Hoffenheim. He made two more appearances for 1. FC Nürnberg in the 2012–13 season. In the 2013–14 season, Stark made appearances for both the first team and second team. He made 21 appearances for the first team and two appearances. He did not score for either team. Again, during the 2014–15 season, Stark made appearances for both the first and second teams. He scored two goals in 26 appearances for the first team. He failed to score in one appearance for the second team. His final match in a Nürnberg jersey proved to be a 2–1 loss to VfL Bochum on 23 August 2015 as he transferred to Hertha BSC the following day. He had scored a goal in four league appearances for Nürnberg in the 2015–16 season. He had also made a German Cup appearance prior to the transfer.

Hertha BSC
Stark signed a four-year contract for Hertha BSC on 24 August 2015. He made his debut on 12 September in a 2–1 win over VfB Stuttgart, when he came off the bench for Salomon Kalou in the 73rd minute. He was able to quickly establish himself as a starter, but suffered a setback in October 2015 due to injury, only returning to the starting eleven in February 2016. He scored his first Bundesliga goal for Hertha on 11 March 2016 in a 2–0 victory against Schalke 04. 

In the following seasons he was also part of the regular team and also made his first European appearances, as Hertha were able to qualify twice for the UEFA Europa League, but both times eliminated from the competition early. At Hertha, he mostly appeared as a centre-back but also as a defensive midfielder. 

On 31 March 2022, it was announced that Stark's expiring contract would not be renewed, and that he would leave Hertha as a free agent after the 2021–22 season.

Werder Bremen
On 28 May 2022, Werder Bremen, newly promoted to the Bundesliga, announced the signing of Stark for the 2022–23 season. He reportedly signed a four-year contract.

International career
On 15 March 2019, Stark was called up for the Germany national team for the first time in his career by national team coach Joachim Löw. He made his debut on 19 November 2019 in a Euro 2020 qualifier against Northern Ireland. He substituted Lukas Klostermann in the 65th minute.

Career statistics

Club

International

Honours
Germany
 UEFA European Under-19 Championship: 2014
 UEFA European Under-21 Championship: 2017

Individual
 Fritz Walter Medal U19 Gold: 2014
2014 UEFA European Under-19 Championship: Team of the Tournament
UEFA European Under-21 Championship Team of the Tournament: 2017

References

External links

1995 births
Living people
People from Neustadt (Aisch)-Bad Windsheim
Sportspeople from Middle Franconia
German footballers
Footballers from Bavaria
Association football defenders
Association football midfielders
Germany international footballers
Germany under-21 international footballers
Germany youth international footballers
Bundesliga players
2. Bundesliga players
1. FC Nürnberg players
1. FC Nürnberg II players
Hertha BSC players
SV Werder Bremen players